Rasoul Pirzadeh (born November 2, 1982) is an Iranian footballer who plays for PAS Hamedan F.C. in the Azadegan League.

Club career
Pirzadeh had played for Shahrdari Tabriz from 2009 to 2012. He also played for Aluminium Hormozgan for one season.

References

Living people
Sportspeople from Tabriz
Shahrdari Tabriz players
Iranian footballers
1982 births
Gostaresh Foulad F.C. players
PAS Hamedan F.C. players
Aluminium Hormozgan F.C. players
Association football midfielders